Bass is an unincorporated community in northern Jackson County, Alabama, United States, located approximately six miles northwest of Stevenson.

History
Bass, originally known as Bass Station, was the site of a station along the  Nashville, Chattanooga and St. Louis Railway (NC&StL), built in 1853.
The name Bass was chosen by Vernon King Stevenson, president of NC&StL, in honor of his wife, whose maiden name was Maria Louisa Bass.  A post office was established in 1873, but it was later closed.  Louisville and Nashville Railroad gained control of NC&StL in 1880 but continued to operate it independently before finally merging in 1957.

References

Unincorporated communities in Alabama
Unincorporated communities in Jackson County, Alabama